"My Heart Belongs to Only You" is a song written by Frank Daniels & Dorothy Daniels. Bette McLaurin and June Christy both released versions of the song in 1952. 
In 1953, the song reached No. 27 on Cash Boxs chart of "The Nation's Top 50 Best Selling Records", in a tandem ranking of June Christy, Bette McLaurin, these versions were marked as bestsellers.

Bobby Vinton recording
The most successful version of the song was recorded by Bobby Vinton on October 23, 1963, and released in February 1964, backed by arranger/conductor Stan Applebaum, and which was released in February 1964.   It was released as a single and on the album There! I've Said It Again. Bobby Vinton's version spent 9 weeks on the Billboard Hot 100 chart, peaking at No. 9, while reaching No. 2 on Billboards Middle-Road Singles chart, No. 8 on the Cash Box Top 100, No. 8 on the Music Vendor Top 100 Pop chart, and No. 15 on Canada's CHUM Hit Parade.

Other recordings
In 1953, Arbee Stidham, and Terry Timmons both recorded versions of the song.
Mary Swan released a version of "My Heart Belongs to Only You" in 1958. Swan performed the song on Dick Clark's American Bandstand.
Jackie Wilson released a version of "My Heart Belongs to Only You" in 1961, which spent 6 weeks on the Billboard Hot 100 chart, peaking at No. 65, while reaching No. 48 on the Cash Box Top 100.
The Standards released their version in 1963 on Chess records.

References

1952 songs
1952 singles
1958 singles
1961 singles
1964 singles
Bobby Vinton songs
Jackie Wilson songs
Brunswick Records singles
Capitol Records singles
Epic Records singles
Swan Records singles